Boardman Local School District is a public school district serving students in Boardman Township, Ohio, United States along with some surrounding areas.

History
In 1899, township officials began to study the concept of centralization and consolidating schools into a single building. In February 1901, the issue of centralizing schools was placed before the electorate. The issue lost by a margin of 53 votes in favour and 44 against. The issue was later declared illegal, as the board of education learned it had the sole legal right to determine centralization.

On 18 April 1904, voters approved a resolution to establish a high school in Boardman. Prior to 1904, students attended eight one-room schoolhouses scattered throughout the township. Later that year, the first centralized school was built on Market Street near the site of the present Boardman Center Intermediate School.

Prior to the 1917-1918 school year, the district only offered two years of high school, with those wanting four years of high school education having to finish their studies in nearby Youngstown. By 1922, the district had established a music program, which to this day is highly acclaimed. In 1935, the high school adopted the nickname of Spartans after the name was submitted in a school newspaper contest. 

By the early 1950s, the centralized school building had started to become overcrowded. In response, the board of education adopted a policy of decentralization of schools, which saw the construction of Market Street, West Boulevard, Stadium Drive, and Robinwood Lane elementary schools later in the decade and Glenwood Junior High School in 1961. In 1969, a new high school building was opened on Glenwood Avenue, replacing the original centralized school building on Market Street.

Schools

High school
 Boardman High School

Middle schools
 Boardman Glenwood Junior High School (grades 7 and 8)
 Boardman Center Intermediate School (grades 4, 5, and 6)

Elementary schools
 Robinwood Lane Elementary School
 Stadium Drive Elementary School
 West Boulevard Elementary School

Former schools
 Market Street Elementary School was closed at the end of the 2018–2019 school year as part of cost saving measures. The building is in the process of being demolished to make way for a retention pond or rain garden.

There were eight original schoolhouses in Boardman, all of which were closed and consolidated into a centralized school on Market Street in 1904. They were:
 Chambers School
 Cornersburg School (located in Cornersburg)
 Gault School (located at the intersection of US-224 and West Boulevard)
 Heintzelman School (in the southwest portion of Boardman)
 Kipper's Corners School (located near the intersection of Shields Road and Market Street)
 Pleasant Grove School (located on South Avenue)
 Rice School (located in Woodworth)
 Shady Hollow School (located on Tippecanoe Road)

References

Education in Mahoning County, Ohio
School districts in Ohio